Shahla may refer to:
 Shahla (given name)
 Shahla, one of the most known family names in early Fayruzah

See also
 Abu Shahla, a Lebanese and Palestinian surname
 Shahla Bagh, another name of the Shalamar Gardens, Lahore